Thamalakane may refer to:

 Thamalakane River, the river created by the Thamalakane fault line
 Thamalakane fault line, a fault line south of the Okavango Delta in Botswana, Africa